Estadio Revolución may refer to:
 Estadio Revolución, Torreón, Mexico
 Estadio Revolución, Irapuato, Mexico, former stadium of Irapuato F.C.
 Estadio Revolución, Guadalajara, Mexico, staged the 1979 Central American and Caribbean Championships in Athletics
 Estadio Revolución Ciudad de Guatemala
 Estadio Revolución, Panama, now renamed as the Estadio Rommel Fernández

See also
 Estadio Revolución Mexicana, Pachuca, Mexico